Moonstruck is a 1987 American romantic comedy-drama film directed and co-produced by Norman Jewison, written by John Patrick Shanley, and starring Cher, Nicolas Cage, Danny Aiello, Olympia Dukakis, and Vincent Gardenia. The film follows Loretta Castorini, a widowed Italian-American woman who falls in love with her fiancé's hot-tempered, estranged younger brother.

Moonstruck had a limited theatrical release on December 18, 1987, and was released nationally on January 15, 1988 by Metro-Goldwyn-Mayer. The film earned critical and commercial success. It received six nominations at the 60th Academy Awards, winning three for Best Actress (Cher), Best Supporting Actress (Dukakis), and Best Original Screenplay (Shanley).

Plot 
Thirty-seven year old Loretta Castorini, an Italian-American widow, works as a bookkeeper and lives in Brooklyn Heights with her family: father Cosmo; mother Rose; and paternal grandfather. Her boyfriend, Johnny Cammareri, proposes to her before leaving for Sicily to be with his dying mother; Loretta is insistent that they carefully follow tradition as she believes her first marriage was cursed by her failure to do so, resulting in her husband's death after two years. Johnny asks Loretta to invite his estranged younger brother Ronny to the wedding. Loretta returns home and informs her parents of the engagement. Cosmo dislikes Johnny and is reluctant to pay for the "real" wedding that Loretta insists on, while Rose is pleased that Loretta likes Johnny but does not love him; she believes that one can easily be hurt by a partner whom one loves.

When Loretta goes to see Ronny at his bakery, he reveals that he has a wooden prosthetic hand and blames Johnny for his loss in a moment of inattention, after which his fiancée left him. Loretta insists that they discuss things in his apartment where she cooks a meal, and both have several (alcoholic) drinks. She tells him that she believes he is a "wolf" who cut off his own hand to escape the trap of a bad relationship, to which Ronny reacts furiously and passionately, kissing Loretta and then carrying her to his bed, where they make love.

That evening, Rose's brother Raymond and his wife Rita join Rose, Cosmo, and Cosmo’s father for dinner and they wonder where Loretta is. Raymond recalls a particularly bright moon like the one shining now that he thought long ago was brought to the house when Cosmo was courting Rose. The next morning, Loretta tells Ronny they can never see each other again. Ronny promises to never bother Loretta again if she attends an opera at the Met with him. She goes to church to confess her infidelity and afterwards calls at Raymond and Rita's store to close out the cash register. Upon leaving, she impulsively goes to a hair salon and buys a glamorous evening gown and shoes at a boutique next door.

Loretta is deeply moved by her first opera, Puccini's La bohème.  As they leave, she sees her father, Cosmo, together with his girlfriend, Mona, and confronts him. As Loretta is with Ronny, he suggests that they agree that they did not see each other at all. Loretta attempts to return home, but Ronny desperately persuades her into another tryst. That same night, Rose decides to dine alone at a restaurant and sees a college professor, Perry, being dramatically dumped by a female student. Rose invites him to dine with her instead, allowing him to walk her home but refusing to invite him in because she is loyal to her marriage. Later, Johnny unexpectedly returns from Sicily after his mother's "miraculous" recovery and arrives at the Castorini house; as Loretta is not there, Rose asks him instead why men chase after women, and agrees that it is because they fear death.

Returning home next morning, Loretta is distressed to learn from Rose that Johnny will be there soon. Ronny arrives, and Rose invites him for breakfast over Loretta's objections. Cosmo and his father emerge from upstairs; Grandpa insists that Cosmo agree to pay for Loretta's wedding. Rose then confronts Cosmo and demands that he end his affair; he is upset but gives in and, at Rose's insistence, also agrees to go to confession. Both reaffirm their love for each other. Raymond and Rita arrive, concerned that Loretta had not deposited the previous day's takings at the bank, and are relieved to learn that she merely forgot and still has the money. When Johnny finally arrives, he breaks off the engagement, superstitiously believing that their marriage would cause his mother's death. Loretta berates Johnny for breaking his promise and throws the engagement ring at him. Seizing the moment, Ronny borrows the ring and asks Loretta to marry him, to which she agrees. The family toasts the couple with champagne and Johnny joins in at Grandpa's urging, since he will now be part of the family after all.

Cast 

 Cher as Loretta Castorini
 Nicolas Cage as Ronny Cammareri
 Olympia Dukakis as Rose Castorini
 Vincent Gardenia as Cosmo Castorini
 Danny Aiello as Johnny Cammareri
 Julie Bovasso as Rita Cappomagi
 Louis Guss as Raymond Cappomagi
 John Mahoney as Perry
 Feodor Chaliapin Jr. as Grandpa Castorini
 Anita Gillette as Mona
 Leonardo Cimino as Felix
 Paula Trueman as Lucy
 Nada Despotovich as Chrissy
 Joe Grifasi as Shy Waiter
 Gina DeAngeles as Old Crone
 Robin Bartlett as Barbara
 Helen Hanft as Lotte
 David S. Howard as Irv
 Robert Weil as Bobo
 Patricia Magrini as Benjamin's Secretary

Reception

Box office 
On its wide release, the film finished third at the US box office and spent 20 nonconsecutive weeks in the top 10 and finally grossed $80,640,528 in the United States and Canada.  Internationally it grossed $41.5 million for a worldwide total of $122.1 million, on a budget of $15 million.

Critical response 
On Rotten Tomatoes the film has an approval rating of 93% based on reviews from 70 critics, with an average score of 7.9/10. The site's consensus read, "Led by energetic performances from Nicolas Cage and Cher, Moonstruck is an exuberantly funny tribute to love and one of the decade's most appealing comedies." On Metacritic the film has a score of 83% based on reviews from 18 critics, indicating "universal acclaim". Audiences polled by CinemaScore gave the film an average grade of "A−" on an A+ to F scale.

Time wrote, "John Patrick Shanley's witty, shapely script puts an octet of New Yorkers under a lunar-tuney spell one romantic night. Cher shines brightest of all." Roger Ebert, who later added the film among his "Great Movies" list, said: "Reviews of the movie tend to make it sound like a madcap ethnic comedy, and that it is. But there is something more here, a certain bittersweet yearning that comes across as ineffably romantic, and a certain magical quality". Film historian Leonard Maltin gave the picture 4 out of 4 stars.

According to Gene Siskel, writing for the Chicago Tribune: "Moonstruck, which is being sold as a romance but actually is one of the funniest pictures to come out in quite some time. [...] You will not easily forget this incredibly robust family, created by writer John Patrick Shanley and directed by Norman Jewison, who makes a comeback with this uproarious film."

It appeared on both critics' Top 10 lists for 1987.

Accolades 

In June 2008, AFI revealed its "Ten top Ten"—the best ten films in ten "classic" American film genres—after polling over 1,500 people from the creative community. Moonstruck was acknowledged as the eighth best film in the romantic comedy genre. The film is also number 72 on Bravo's "100 Funniest Movies," and number 41 on AFI's 100 Years... 100 Laughs.

The film is recognized by American Film Institute in these lists:
 1998: AFI's 100 Years...100 Movies – Nominated
 2000: AFI's 100 Years...100 Laughs – #41
 2002: AFI's 100 Years...100 Passions – #17
 2004: AFI's 100 Years...100 Songs:
 "That's Amore" – Nominated
 2005: AFI's 100 Years...100 Movie Quotes:
 Loretta Castorini: "Snap out of it!" – #96
 2007: AFI's 100 Years...100 Movies (10th Anniversary Edition) – Nominated
 2008: AFI's 10 Top 10:
 #8 Romantic Comedy Film

Influential film critic Roger Ebert entered the film to his "Great Movies" collection in June 2003.

Soundtrack 

Soundtrack references:

References

External links 

 
 
 
 
 
 Moonstruck: Life in the In-Between an essay by Emily St. James at the Criterion Collection

1987 films
1987 romantic comedy films
American romantic comedy films
Films directed by Norman Jewison
Films about dysfunctional families
Films featuring a Best Actress Academy Award-winning performance
Films featuring a Best Musical or Comedy Actress Golden Globe winning performance
Films featuring a Best Supporting Actress Academy Award-winning performance
Films featuring a Best Supporting Actress Golden Globe-winning performance
Films set in Brooklyn
Films set in New York City
Films shot in New York City
Films with screenplays by John Patrick Shanley
Films whose writer won the Best Original Screenplay Academy Award
Films about Italian-American culture
1980s Italian-language films
Metro-Goldwyn-Mayer films
1980s English-language films
1980s American films